Saint-Pantaléon-de-Larche (literally Saint-Pantaléon of Larche) is a commune in the Corrèze department in central France.

Population

See also
Communes of the Corrèze department

References

Communes of Corrèze